German submarine U-506 was a Type IXC U-boat of Nazi Germany's Kriegsmarine during World War II. The submarine was laid down on 11 July 1940 at the Deutsche Werft yard in Hamburg as yard number 296, launched on 20 June 1941 and commissioned on 15 September 1941 under the command of Kapitänleutnant Erich Würdemann.

After completing her training with the 4th U-boat Flotilla based at Stettin, U-506 was transferred to the 10th U-boat Flotilla for front-line service on 1 February 1942. She sank 14 ships, three were classified as 'damaged' another vessel was declared a 'total loss'. The submarine's missions, particularly the sinking of the merchant ship Heredia and later involvement in the so-called Laconia Incident is chronicled in the 2016 book So Close to Home.

She was sunk in the Atlantic on 12 July 1943 by depth charges dropped by a US B-24 Liberator.

Design
German Type IXC submarines were slightly larger than the original Type IXBs. U-506 had a displacement of  when at the surface and  while submerged. She had two shafts and two  propellers.

U-506 was fitted with six  torpedo tubes (four fitted at the bow and two at the stern), 22 torpedoes, one  SK C/32 naval gun, 180 rounds, and a  SK C/30 as well as a  C/30 anti-aircraft gun. The boat had a complement of forty-eight.

Service history

First patrol
U-506 first departed Hamburg on 2 March 1942 and sailed to Heligoland, leaving there on 9 March for her first patrol, which took her around the British Isles to Lorient in occupied France via the gap between the Shetland and Faeroe Islands, by 25 March.

Second patrol
The U-boat sailed from Lorient on 6 April 1942, crossed the Atlantic, and entered the Gulf of Mexico to operate off the Mississippi River Delta against the crucial oil trade. En route she sank a Nicaraguan merchant ship off the southern tip of Florida. Between 10 and 20 May she sank three American oil tankers and a banana boat, and damaged four other oil tankers, one so badly it was declared a total loss. On the return journey she sank two British merchant ships off the Bahamas, eventually returning to Lorient on 15 June.

Third patrol
U-506 sailed from Lorient once again on 28 July 1942 and headed south to the coast of West Africa, operating against ships sailing from Freetown, Sierra Leone. There she sank five more merchant ships, four British, one Swedish. On the return journey the U-boat took part in the rescue operations after the sinking of the RMS Laconia, before returning to Lorient on 7 November after 103 days at sea.

Fourth patrol
The U-boat sailed from Lorient on 14 December 1942 and again headed south, this time to the coast of South Africa, where she sank two merchant ships, one British, the other Norwegian, before returning to base on 8 May. She was away even longer than on her third patrol-146 days.

Fifth patrol
U-506s final voyage began on 6 July 1943. On 12 July the U-boat was attacked by a USAAF B-24 Liberator bomber of the 1st Anti-Submarine Squadron in the North Atlantic west of Vigo, Spain, in position . The U-boat was located by the aircraft's SC137 10 cm radar, which the Germans could not detect, and was attacked with seven depth charges. The U-boat broke in two, and about 15 men were seen in the water by the pilot, who dropped a liferaft and a smoke flare. Only six men were rescued by a British destroyer three days later.

Summary of raiding history

References

Bibliography

External links

German Type IX submarines
World War II submarines of Germany
World War II shipwrecks in the Atlantic Ocean
U-boats sunk in 1943
U-boats sunk by depth charges
U-boats sunk by US aircraft
Maritime incidents in July 1943
1941 ships
U-boats commissioned in 1941
Ships built in Hamburg
Caribbean Sea operations of World War II
Wars involving the Bahamas